Thomas H. Lee Partners, L.P. is an American private equity firm based in Boston. Investing in middle market growth companies across financial technology, services, healthcare, technology, & business solutions.

History
Founded in 1974 by its namesake Thomas H. Lee, Thomas H. Lee Partners, often referenced as THL, has raised approximately $34 billion of equity capital, investing in more than 160 companies, and has completed more than 500 add-on acquisitions representing an aggregate enterprise value at acquisition of over $210 billion. In 2021, Private Equity International ranked THL Partners 82nd of the top 300 private equity firms based on funds raised. 

THL’s Management Committee includes Co-CEOs Todd Abbrecht and Scott Sperling, Chairman Tony DiNovi and Managing Director Tom Hagerty. The firm's namesake, Thomas H. Lee, left the firm and formed Lee Equity Partners in 2006.

Investments
The firm has raised over $30 billion since inception and is currently investing out of its $5.6 billion ninth fund: 
 1984 - Fund I ($66 million)
 1989 - Fund II ($568 million)
 1996 - Fund III ($1.4 billion)
 1998 - Fund IV ($3.5 billion)
 2001 - Fund V ($6.1 billion)
 2006 - Fund VI ($8.1 billion)
 2016 - Fund VII ($2.6 billion)
 2019 - Fund VIII ($3.59 billion)
 2022 - Fund IX ($5.6 billion)

Other Funds 
 2019 – Continuation Fund I ($867 million)
 2020 – Continuation Fund II ($916 million) 
 2021 – Automation Fund ($900 million)

Source: Thomas H. Lee website

Notable transactions sponsored by THL include AbacusNext, Aramark, AutoStore, Brooks Automation,
Ceridian, CSafe Global,
Dunkin' Brands, 
Experian, Fidelity National Information Services, FourKites, Hightower Advisors, HomeSide Lending, Houghton Mifflin, Syneos Health,
Michael Foods, The Nielsen Company, ProSiebenSat.1, Smile Doctors, Snapple, Warner Chilcott, Warner Music Group, and West Corporation.

Refco

In 2004, THL completed a leveraged buyout acquisition of Refco, a financial services company specializing in commodities and futures contracts, which collapsed suddenly in October 2005 only months after its IPO. Refco's collapse cost investors more than $1 billion and sparked multiple suits for negligence against the firm. THL in turn sued Refco's auditors and former executives claiming they hid the fraud which caused Refco's collapse. THL has since settled all claims by Refco’s brokerage customers, bankruptcy trustee and shareholders.

Art Van
In March 2020, the THL-owned furniture retailer Art Van Furniture filed for Chapter 11  bankruptcy. The company was forced to end its going-out-of-business sales two days after they were approved due to the COVID-19 pandemic in the United States. While Art Van wanted to pay employee wages and health care obligations, the company as a debtor-in-possession could not choose to pay employees at the expense of creditors without a court order. THL subsequently established  a 'Hardship Fund' for former employees.

THL seeded the fund with an initial donation of $1 million and also pledged to match up to another $1 million in outside donations. In March 2021, THL funded its full matching commitment, resulting in relief payments of approximately $1,200 per former employee.

Affiliates
THL's past affiliates include:

THL Credit Advisors acquired in 2020 by First Eagle Investment Managed, provided junior debt to middle-market companies seeking capital for growth, acquisition, recapitalization and/or change of control. In July 2020, THL Credit changed its name to First Eagle Alternative Capital BDC, Inc. 

TH Lee Putnam Ventures is a technology-focused private equity firm affiliated with THL and Putnam Investments, a leading global money management firm. TH Lee Putnam Ventures manages $1.1 billion in capital commitments and has invested approximately $850 million in more than 43 companies since the firm's formation in 1999.

Notes

External links

Thomas H. Lee (FundingUniverse.com, from International Directory of Company Histories, Vol. 24. St. James Press, 1999.)
Banks Balk at Paying for Clear Channel Deal (New York Times, 2008)

Financial services companies of the United States
Private equity firms of the United States
Companies based in Boston
American companies established in 1974
Financial services companies established in 1974
1974 establishments in Massachusetts